The Ingle Brothers Broomcorn Warehouse, in Shattuck, Oklahoma, was listed on the National Register of Historic Places in 2009.  It is located at 320 NW 1st St., at Oklahoma Avenue, in Shattuck.

It was built in 1909.  A photo shows it is a gable-front brick building with a stepped gable.

References

Warehouses
National Register of Historic Places in Ellis County, Oklahoma
Stepped gables